Madron Urban District was an urban district in Cornwall, England, based on Madron. It was created in 1894 and abolished in 1934 when it was absorbed by the Municipal Borough of Penzance and West Penwith Rural District.

References

External links

 Madron UD archives at The National Archives

Urban districts of England
Penwith
History of Cornwall
Local government in Cornwall